The Luolishaniidae or Luolishaniida are a group of Cambrian and Ordovician lobopodians with anterior 5 or 6 pairs of setiferous lobopods. Most luolishaniids also have posterior lobopods each with a hooked claws, and thorn-shaped sclerites arranged as three or more per trunk segment. The type genus is based on Luolishania longicruris Hou and Chen, 1989, from the Chengjiang Lagerstatte, South China. They are presumed to have been benthic suspension or filter feeders.

New specimens of the previously enigmatic Facivermis show that it was a sessile tube-dweller, and part of this group.

References

Lobopodia
Cambrian invertebrates
Prehistoric protostome families